Angelina Vásquez (born 1950) is a Chilean documentary filmmaker who was exiled to Finland following the 1973 Chilean coup but returned to film clandestinely during the Pinochet dictatorship in the early 1980s. Like Marilú Mallet in Canada and Valeria Sarmiento in France, she is notable as one of the first Chilean women film directors, emerging in the early 1970s but producing most of her work in exile.

Filmography
 Crónica del salitre (1971)
 Dos años en Finlandia (1975)
 Así nace un desaparecido (1977)
 Gracias a la vida (o la pequeña historia de una mujer maltratada) (1980)
 Presencia lejana (1982)
 Apuntes nicaragüenses (1982)
 Fragmentos de un diario inacabado (1983)
 Notas para un retrato de familia (1989)
 Empresarias de Madrid (1989)

References

Bibliography
 Elizabeth Ramírez and Catalina Donoso (eds.) Nomadías. El cine de Marilú Mallet, Valeria Sarmiento y Angelina Vásquez (Ediciones Metales Pesados, 2016) ,

External links

1950 births
Living people
Chilean film directors
Chilean exiles
Chilean women film directors